Heteropsis peitho, the forest patroller, is a butterfly in the family Nymphalidae. It is found in Guinea, Liberia, Ivory Coast, Ghana, Nigeria, Cameroon, Gabon, the Republic of the Congo, the Democratic Republic of the Congo, Uganda, western Kenya and north-western Tanzania. The habitat consists of high forests.

Subspecies
Heteropsis peitho peitho (Guinea, Liberia, Ivory Coast, Ghana, Nigeria, Cameroon, Gabon, Congo, Democratic Republic of the Congo)
Heteropsis peitho gigas (Libert, 2006) (western Kenya, north-western Tanzania)
Heteropsis peitho reducta (Libert, 2006) (Uganda)

References

Elymniini
Butterflies described in 1880
Butterflies of Africa